Khrustalevo (Xrustali) is a rural locality (a village) in Truntaishevsky Selsoviet, Alsheyevsky District, Bashkortostan, Russia. The population was 62 as of 2010. There are 4 streets.

Geography 
Khrustalevo is located 35 km west of Rayevsky (the district's administrative centre) by road. Sarayevo is the nearest rural locality.

References 

Rural localities in Alsheyevsky District